Lucy Cooke is a British zoologist, author, television producer, director, and presenter. She has an undergraduate masters in zoology from New College, Oxford, where she was tutored by Richard Dawkins.

She began her career in television comedy production, and then moved into documentaries, later specialising in natural history. Among others, she is credited as director and producer for Balderdash and Piffle, director for Medieval Lives and You Don't Know You're Born, and presenter of Springwatch.

She has presented a range of natural history programmes for the BBC. In 2015 she presented Nature's Boldest Thieves and Animals Unexpected. In 2016 she was a co-presenter on the four part series Ingenious Animals. She was a team captain on the BBC Quiz show Curious Creatures, which ran for two series from 2017 to 2018. In 2019, she presented the Animal Planet series Nature's Strangest Mysteries: Solved.

In 2020 she presented Inside the Bat Cave, which was broadcast on the BBC.

She is the author of The Truth About Animals: Stoned Sloths, Lovelorn Hippos, and Other Tales from the Wild Side of Wildlife, which investigates popular misconceptions about animals, including sloths, hyenas, penguins, and pandas. She had previously written three books about sloths: A Little Book of Sloth, The Power of Sloth, and Life in the Sloth Lane: Slow Down and Smell the Hibiscus.

She is also the author of a revolutionary guide to sex, evolution and the female animal, published in 2022.

Bibliography 
 A Little Book of Sloth (2013)
 The Power of Sloth (2014)
 The Truth About Animals: Stoned Sloths, Lovelorn Hippos, and Other Tales from the Wild Side of Wildlife (2017)
 Life in the Sloth Lane: Slow Down and Smell the Hibiscus (2018)
 Bitch: On the Female of the Species (2022)

References 

Year of birth missing (living people)
Living people
British zoologists
British writers
British television producers
British television directors
British television presenters